Lost Dakota was a small, uninhabited portion of land that was left over after the division and organization of the large former Dakota Territory into new territories in the late 19th century, which was overlooked by the federal government for years.

Geography 
The exclave was located at the tripoint between the current states of Idaho, Wyoming, and Montana. Lost Dakota was located 360 miles (580 km) west of the territory, which by then consisted of the current Dakota states. Its borders ran along the Continental Divide, parallel 44°30' North, and the 111th meridian West.

History and current status 
Officially, the land was still a remote part of the Dakota Territory; however, it had been forgotten by the government, wiped from any potential public view that it could have had for around five whole years due to faulty maps and surveys. It has retrospectively been speculated to have been a superb tactical area for criminals to escape the law from, due to its forgotten location and lack of development; however, there is no evidence proving that criminals ever sought refuge in the exclave. In 1873, it was annexed and thereby incorporated into Gallatin County, Montana Territory, and has remained part of that county in the state of Montana ever since. Lost Dakota is extremely distant from settlement to this day and is completely undeveloped. It is without a street, road, or even a footpath as of 2010, and lacks any signs or maps to locate the uninhabited area. It is also reportedly "plagued" by grizzly bears.

See also 

 Exclave
 Dakota Territory
 Yellowstone National Park
 West Yellowstone
 Montana Territory
 Northwest United States
 Rural Areas in the United States
 List of autonomous territories
 List of Uninhabited Regions
 Wilderness
 Zone of Death (Yellowstone), an adjacent area of Yellowstone National Park whose legal jurisdiction came into question during the 21st century
 Tristate Region
 51st State

References

1873 disestablishments in the United States
Exclaves in the United States
Geography of Gallatin County, Montana
Former exclaves
Former regions and territories of the United States
1873 in Dakota Territory
1873 in Montana Territory